Richard Harman (c. 1621 – 1646) was an English politician who sat in the House of Commons  from 1640 to 1646.

Harman was born at St Andrew's, Norwich,  the son of Richard Harman, alderman, of Norwich. He was educated at Norwich School under Mr Briggs and was admitted at Sidney Sussex College, Cambridge on 28 March 1638 aged 17. He was admitted at Gray's Inn on 18 March 1640.

In November 1640, Harman was elected Member of Parliament for Norwich in the Long Parliament.  He sat until his death in 1646.

References

1621 births
1646 deaths
English MPs 1640–1648
Politicians from Norwich
Alumni of Sidney Sussex College, Cambridge
Members of Gray's Inn
People educated at Norwich School
Year of birth uncertain